Norma Shearer (1902–1983) was a Canadian American film actress who was nominated five times for an Academy Award. She and her sister Athole were assisted in their pursuit of show business careers by their mother Edith Fisher Shearer. After amassing numerous letters of introduction from a variety of show business-related people in Canada, the trio relocated to New York, hoping to get into musical theatre. 

She gained an introduction to impresario Florence Ziegfeld, who was unimpressed and turned her down. Shearer continued to pursue her career ambitions and spent five years being cast in bit parts in silent movies before landing a contract in 1923 with Louis B. Mayer, who had just formed Metro-Goldwyn-Mayer (MGM), with Irving Thalberg as his head of production. After a start in silent films, Shearer made a transition to sound film. She remained with MGM for the rest of her career, with occasional loan-outs to other studios. Shearer and Thalberg eventually married.

Shearer chose her own roles, frequently going against the professional advice of others. Her husband did not believe she would be well suited for the lead character in 1930 American pre-Code drama film The Divorcee.  Nevertheless, she went against his counsel and made the movie, hiring celebrity photographer George Hurrell for a photo session to prove her sexual allure could translate to film. Her performance earned her the 1930 Academy Award for Best Actress. She was also nominated that same year for her performance in Their Own Desire. Shearer was nominated four more times for Academy Award for Best Actress: the 1931 film A Free Soul, the 1934 film The Barretts of Wimpole Street, the 1936 film Romeo and Juliet, and the 1938 film Marie Antoinette. 

When her husband died in 1936, Shearer continued with her film career at MGM. Coming on the heels of her success in Marie Antoinette, a nationwide publicity campaign was launched to cast Scarlett O'Hara in Gone with the Wind. Producer David O. Selznick, however, had offered the role to Shearer. Her fans were incensed that she would portray a woman of such questionable character, and she eventually turned down the offer. 

Norma's brother Douglas had remained in Canada until around 1925, when she introduced him to Louis B. Mayer, who arranged training for him at Bell Labs in the technique of adding sound to film. Her brother went on to earn 12 Academy Awards for his sound contributions to MGM.

Shearer received a star on the Hollywood Walk of Fame on February 8, 1960.

Silent films: 1919–1928

Sound films: 1928–1963

Bibliography

References

Actress filmographies
American filmographies
Canadian filmographies